"I Like It" is a song by American rapper Cardi B, with Puerto Rican rapper Bad Bunny and Colombian singer J Balvin. It was released on May 25, 2018, to radio stations through Atlantic Records as the fourth single from her debut studio album, Invasion of Privacy (2018). "I Like It" is a Latin trap and hip hop song that comprises a trap drum beat and Boogaloo music. It was written by the three performers along with Pardison Fontaine and Klenord Raphael, while the production was handled by J. White Did It, Tainy, Craig Kallman and Invincible. The song contains a sample from "I Like It Like That", replayed by musicians during production, with Tony Pabón, Manny Rodriguez, and Benny Bonnilla being credited as co-writers.

Work on the song took from October 2017 to early April 2018. Its music video was filmed in Little Havana, Miami and has received more than 1.4 billion views. The single topped the US Billboard Hot 100, becoming Cardi B's second number one—the first time a female rapper achieved this in the chart's history, and the first for both Bad Bunny and J Balvin. It also reached the top 10 in Canada, Ireland, New Zealand, Portugal, Slovakia, Spain, Switzerland, and the United Kingdom. Critically acclaimed, Billboard staff, Los Angeles Times, and Apple Music's editorial selection ranked it as the best song of the year, while Rolling Stone named it "the best summer song of all time."

"I Like It" was nominated for Record of the Year at the 61st Annual Grammy Awards. The song was certified Diamond by the Recording Industry Association of America (RIAA) in 2021 for selling more than 10 million units, becoming the second song from the album to receive this certification, following "Bodak Yellow", thus extending Cardi B's record as the female rapper with the most Diamond-certified songs, as her third, and earning her a Guinness World Record for a tie for the most among female artists. It became the first female rap song to surpass a billion streams on Spotify, also making Cardi B the first woman in hip hop with a pair of billion-streamers on the service, joining her collaboration "Girls Like You". "I Like It" is the highest-ranked female rap song on the Billboard Hot 100 decade-end chart for the 2010s. As of 2021, it is the most-streamed song by a female rapper in the UK. Rolling Stone ranked it on the 500 Greatest Songs of All Time at number 384.

Background

During the recording sessions of Invasion of Privacy, Cardi and her team were listening to beats and song ideas. Craig Kallman proposed to include a track that pays homage to her Latin heritage and searched among his Latin music collection of records that he used to play when he was a DJ. Decided for Pete Rodriguez's "I Like It Like That" and "Oh That's Nice", he added J. White to the production process. The sample of the former song "over a very rough instrumental" and with a Cardi verse on it was sent to musician Edgar Machuca. White and Machuca worked on the production, chopping up the sample and trying to "make the song sound better and cohesive and beef up the production." Cardi re-wrote the hook a number of times and cut vocals, eventually choosing the chorus she was most comfortable with. The three producers looped the "I Like It" part as they felt that was the catchiest part of the sample. Machuca proposed to add Bad Bunny and J Balvin to the track, with both artists contributing with their verses and ideas. Tainy and Invicible finished working on the production focusing on the instrumentals. Work on the record started in October 2017, and finished in early April 2018.

Production
"I Like It" is a Latin trap and hip hop song. It is a blend of trap and salsa, and interpolates 1967 boogaloo song "I Like It Like That". By replaying the sample instead of using the physical sample, its owners receive compensation and credit for their composition, with production saving money and retaining publishing ownership. As noted by a Billboard editor, the song is "heavily indebted to the world of Latin hip hop." Bad Bunny and J Balvin perform in Spanish and English.

Critical reception
"I Like It" received critical acclaim. Writing for Rolling Stone, Brittany Spanos deemed it "the song of the summer" and commented "[it] sounds like it was chemically concocted in a mad scientist's lab to be 2018's reigning song of the summer. [...] Everything about this song is perfect for summer: the trap-meets-salsa beat, features from two of reggaeton's biggest stars, a sample of Pete Rodriguez's half-century-old boogaloo hit 'I Like It Like That'." In The Atlantic, Hannah Giorgis also deemed it "song of the summer" considering "[the song] is irresistible because it channels the rapper at her best: when she feels at home." She also noted that the verses from both Bad Bunny and J Balvin "match Cardi's energy" and "add complementary dynamism to the track." Neil Z. Yeung of AllMusic considered it a "notable highlight" of the album. At the end of the year, Entertainment Weekly opined, "[the song] will be on summer rotation long past 2018." Rolling Stone staff ranked "I Like It" among the best songs of the 2010s, deeming it Cardi's "hugely expansive vision of hip-hop as a multicultural, worldwide block party."

Accolades

Commercial performance
Prior to its release as a single, the song debuted at number eight on the US Billboard Hot 100, becoming Cardi B's fifth top-ten entry on the chart and the highest debut of the songs from the album, which all debuted on the Hot 100 during the album's first week of release. Bad Bunny and J Balvin earned their first and second top 10s, respectively. Following the release of the single's accompanying music video, the song rose to a new peak of number seven on the chart, For the chart issue dated June 16, with "I Like It" and "Girls Like You", her collaboration with Maroon 5 charting at number four, Cardi B scored two concurrent Hot 100 top-five singles for the second time in 2018. It ascended to number two the next week, blocked from the top by XXXTentacion's "Sad!". It reached number one in its twelfth week, earning Cardi her second chart-topper, thus making her the first female rapper in history to do so. Bad Bunny and J Balvin scored their first number one. She also became the first female soloist to reach number one with two songs from a debut album since Lady Gaga, who did it in 2009. "I Like It" reached number one on Digital Songs in its 20th chart week, claiming the sixth-longest wait to the summit since the chart began in 2004. It also became Cardi B's second number one song on the Radio Songs chart. Internationally, the single also charted within the top 10 in Canada, Ireland, New Zealand, Portugal, Slovakia, Spain, Switzerland and the United Kingdom. In the United States, "I Like It" reigned in the charts for 51 weeks, which made Cardi B the first female rapper to have a song chart that long.

"I Like It" became the first Latin trap song to top the Hot 100. Editor Leila Cobo for Billboard explained its notability, "it's part of an accelerated spike of Spanish and Spanish-infused songs on the chart [...] This surge can be attributed at least in part to streaming, which has broadened the scope for Latin music that is still shunned from major mainstream outlets. But it also reflects the times, the moment and the new openness of the world, despite the entrenchment at the border."

"I Like It" also became the first number one single—and the first Latin trap song in this genre to do so—on the Billboard Dance/Mix Show Airplay chart for Cardi B, Bad Bunny, and J Balvin, reaching that summit in its September 1, 2018 issue, benefitting from the support from both the 80 reporting stations (dual Top 40/CHR and Rhythmic outlets who submit their mix show hours or incorporate it in their playlist) and the core full-time Dance/EDM stations, the latter utilizing the remixed Dance versions of the song. It was Billboards top song of the year by a female artist on both Hot Rap Songs and Hot R&B/Hip-Hop Songs.

"I Like It" was 2018's most streamed song by a female artist on Apple Music globally, and sixth overall. It was also the year's most streamed song by a female artist in Canada, and sixth among all artists.

Music video

The song's accompanying music video was directed by Eif Rivera and filmed in March 2018 in Little Havana, Miami. A preview of the clip was featured on YouTube Music's announcement video on May 23. Released on May 29, 2018, the music video opens with Cardi B in a neighborhood, followed by scenes of Bad Bunny in the streets and J Balvin in a club. It also features scenes of the trio performing together.

Director Eif Rivera stated in an interview that he was inspired by the movie I Like It Like That (1994), which opening scene centered in a neighborhood of the South Bronx. People en Español stated that the video "transports" the viewer "to be part of scenes and traditions worthy of a tropical afternoon." The magazine and Vibe noted Cardi B's garments and "traditional rumba clothing accessories" inspired by Celia Cruz.

"I Like It" topped YouTube's 2018 Songs of the Summer list in the United States, and ranked fifth globally. As of September 2022, it has received over 1.5 billion views.

Live performances
Cardi B, Bad Bunny and J Balvin gave the first live performance of "I Like It" at the 2018 Coachella Music Festival during its second weekend, on April 22. The trio delivered the first televised performance of the song at the 2018 American Music Awards. Featuring colorful outfits and visuals, they were accompanied by a live band composed by trumpet and bongo players. Cardi started the performance by lying atop a rotating circular stage; she then ripped off the voluminous tulle and performed a salsa dance. Bad Bunny was wheeled in for his verse in a grocery cart, while J Balvin joined hanging by the DJ booth. The Billboard article reviewing the ceremony named it the best performance of the night.

Bad Bunny performed the song with Shakira during the Super Bowl LIV halftime show.

Impact
Julyssa Lopez of Remezcla opined that "I Like It" leading the American charts "helps buttress the position of Spanish-language music in the Anglo and international pop spheres—and signals that [2017]'s moments  could have more staying power" as it "adds another moment of renewed visibility for Latino artists and bilingual music." Stereogum staff also noticed that it "continued to firm up a lane for Spanish language in the American pop mainstream." In 2019, Vulture writer Gary Suarez stated that "I Like It" marked the introduction to a mainstream, massive audience of "a musical movement otherwise unknown to their ears", "transformed" Bad Bunny into "a household name" and "set the stage" for his full-length debut X 100pre. El Mundo newspaper also opined that the song made him connect with an international Gen Z audience. Similarly, Gary Suarez for the Forbes website said that the song "essentially introduced Latin trap to the masses." In Slate, Chris Molanphy considered that the artists produced "a different and more interesting animal" than previous Latin-influenced chart-toppers in the Anglo-market, and deemed it "a Trojan Horse distinct from any of the crossover records either of the 2017–18 wave or of the Latin Boom 1.0. in 1999." Pitchfork cited it among the songs that made Urbano music reach "critical mass".

Awards and nominations

Track listing
Digital download – Dillon Francis remix
"I Like It" (Dillon Francis remix) – 3:39

Digital download – German remix
"I Like It" (featuring Kontra K and AK Ausserkontrolle) – 4:14

12-inch single
"I Like It" – 4:13
"I Like It" (instrumental) – 4:13
"I Like It" (Dillon Francis remix) – 3:39
"I Like It" (radio edit) – 4:11

Credits and personnel
Credits adapted from Tidal.

Cardi B – vocals
Bad Bunny – vocals
J Balvin – vocals
J. White Did It – producer
Tainy – producer
Craig Kallman – producer
Evan LaRay – recording engineer
Invincible – co-producer
Nick Seeley – additional producer
Colin Leonard – mastering engineer
Juan Chaves – trumpet
Michael Romero – background vocals
Sarah Sellers – background vocals
Nick Seeley – background vocals
Andrew Tinker – background vocals
Holly Seeley – background vocals
Leslie Brathwaite – mixer

Charts

Weekly charts

Year-end charts

Decade-end charts

Certifications

Release history

References

External links

2018 songs
2018 singles
Atlantic Records singles
Billboard Hot 100 number-one singles
Cardi B songs
Bad Bunny songs
J Balvin songs
Latin trap songs
Spanglish songs
Song recordings produced by J. White Did It
Songs written by Cardi B
Songs written by J Balvin
Songs written by Pardison Fontaine
Songs written by Bad Bunny
Songs written by Tainy
Songs written by J. White Did It
Songs written by Klenord Raphael
Number-one singles in Israel